The 1942 Salisbury by-election was a by-election held for the British House of Commons constituency of Salisbury in Wiltshire on 8 July 1942.  It was won by the Conservative Party candidate John Morrison, later Baron Margadale.

Vacancy 
The seat had become vacant on the death of the 55-year-old sitting Conservative Member of Parliament (MP) James Despencer-Robertson. He had won the seat at a by-election in 1931, having previously been MP for Islington West from 1922 to 1923.

Candidates 
The Conservative candidate was 36-year-old John Morrison.

During World War II, most by-elections were unopposed, since the major parties had agreed not to contest by-elections when vacancies arose in seats held by the other parties; contests occurred only when independent candidates or minor parties chose to stand, and the Common Wealth Party was formed with the specific aim of contesting war-time by-elections.

In Salisbury, there were two independent candidates: 
William Reginald Hipwell, editor of Reveille, a " barrack room newspaper for the fighting forces",  stood as an Independent Progressive and J. D. Monro as an "Independent Democrat".

Result 
On a greatly reduced turnout, Morrison held the seat for the Conservatives, with more than two-thirds of the votes and a majority of 8,858. He held the seat until his elevation to the peerage in 1965.

Votes

See also
Salisbury (UK Parliament constituency)
Salisbury
1931 Salisbury by-election
1965 Salisbury by-election
List of United Kingdom by-elections

References 
Notes

Sources
 

By-elections to the Parliament of the United Kingdom in Wiltshire constituencies
1942 in England
1942 elections in the United Kingdom
Politics of Salisbury
20th century in Wiltshire